The Tenasserim lutung (Trachypithecus barbei) is a species of lutung. It is found in Myanmar and Thailand.

It is named after the Tenasserim Hills.

Phylogenetic evidence indicates that the Tenasserim lutung is an ancestor of the far more widespread Indochinese grey langur (T. crepusculus), with T. crepusculus being a product of ancient hybridization between the Tenasserim lutung and ancestral obscurus-group langurs.

References

Tenasserim lutung
Primates of Southeast Asia
Mammals of Myanmar
Mammals of Thailand
Tenasserim lutung
Tenasserim lutung
Tenasserim Hills